Melvin Nyffeler is a Swiss professional ice hockey goaltender  who is currently playing with the SC Rapperswil-Jona Lakers of the National League (NL). He previously played with the ZSC Lions and with HC Fribourg-Gottéron of the National League (NL).

Playing career
Nyffeler made his professional debut with the GCK Lions in the Swiss League (SL) during the 2012/13 season. He made his National League debut with the ZSC Lions during the 2013–14 season.

On January 27, 2014, Nyffeler was signed to a three-year contract by Genève-Servette HC.  The deal fell through and on June 16, 2014, Nyffeler eventually signed a one-year contract with HC Fribourg-Gottéron for the 2014–15 season. Nyffeler spent the next two seasons under contract with EHC Kloten of the NL but mostly played on loan with the SC Rapperswil-Jona Lakers of the SL. He was the starting goaltender for the 2017/18 season with the Lakers, helping the team gain promotion to the NL in April 2018. On October 10, 2018, Nyffeler was signed to a two-year contract extension with the Lakers to be their number one goalie in the NL.

International play
Nyffeler made his debut with the Switzerland men's national team in December 2019.

Career statistics

International

References

External links

1994 births
Living people
HC Fribourg-Gottéron players
GCK Lions players
SC Rapperswil-Jona Lakers players
Swiss ice hockey goaltenders
People from Uster District
Sportspeople from the canton of Zürich
ZSC Lions players